Last Days of Boot Hill is a 1947 American Western film directed by Ray Nazarro and written by Norman S. Hall. The film stars Charles Starrett, Virginia Hunter, Paul Campbell, Mary Newton and Smiley Burnette. The film was released on November 20, 1947, by Columbia Pictures.

Plot

Cast          
Charles Starrett as Steve Waring / The Durango Kid
Virginia Hunter as Paula Thorpe
Paul Campbell as Frank Rayburn
Mary Newton as Clara Brent
Smiley Burnette as Smiley Burnette

References

External links
 

1947 films
1940s English-language films
American Western (genre) films
1947 Western (genre) films
Columbia Pictures films
Films directed by Ray Nazarro
American black-and-white films
1940s American films